Trespuentes (in Basque Tresponde and officially Tresponde/Trespuentes) is a village in Álava, Basque Country, Spain.

Its name comes from the Latin Tras pontem, which is translated as on the other side of the bridge. This is because a bridge which is still on and which separated the village from the Iruña-Veleia Roman city.

In 2015 it had 265 inhabitants.

Nowadays it is within the municipality of Iruña de Oca, but until 1976 Trespuentes was the capital village of another municipality called Iruña, which also comprised the neighbor village of Víllodas.

References 

Populated places in Álava